Azymite (from Ancient Greek ázymos, unleavened bread) is a term of reproach used by the Eastern Orthodox Church since the eleventh century against the Latin Church, who, together with the Armenians and the Maronites, celebrate the Eucharist with unleavened bread. Some Latin controversialists have responded by assailing the Greeks as "Fermentarians" and "Prozymites".

The canon law of the Latin Church of the Catholic Church mandates the use of unleavened bread for the Host, and unleavened wafers for the communion of the faithful. On the other hand, most Eastern churches explicitly forbid the use of unleavened bread (Greek: azymos artos) for the Eucharist. Eastern Christians associate unleavened bread with the Old Testament and allow only for bread with yeast, as a symbol of the New Covenant in Christ's blood. Indeed, this usage figures as one of the three points of contention that traditionally accounted as causes (along with the issues of Petrine supremacy and the filioque in the Niceno-Constantinopolitan Creed) of the Great Schism of 1054 between Eastern and Western churches.

History
The Western Church has always maintained the validity of consecration with either leavened bread or unleavened bread. Whether the bread which Jesus used at the Last Supper was leavened or unleavened is the central question giving rise to this issue. Various arguments exist for which kind was used. Regarding the usage of the primitive Church, knowledge is so scant, and the testimonies so apparently contradictory, that many theologians have pronounced the problem incapable of definitive solution.

In the ninth century the use of unleavened bread had become universal and obligatory in the West, while the Greeks, desirous of emphasizing the distinction between the Jewish and the Christian Pasch, continued the exclusive offering of leavened bread. Photius made no use of a point of attack which occupies a prominent place in later Orthodox polemics. The western explanation is that Photius saw that the position of the Latins could not successfully be assailed. Two centuries later, the quarrel with Rome was resumed by a patriarch who was not deterred by this consideration. As a visible symbol of Catholic unity, it had been the custom to maintain Greek churches and monasteries in Rome and some of Latin Rite in Constantinople. The issue became divisive when the provinces of Byzantine Italy which were under the authority of the Patriarch of Constantinople were forcibly incorporated into the Church of Rome following their invasion by the Norman armies, said churches which were forced by Rome to use unleavened bread.

In response, Michael Cerularius ordered all the Latin churches in the Byzantine capital to be closed, and the Latin monks to be expelled.

Patriarch Michael Cerularius was responding to a concrete situation within his territory – the persecution of the Byzantine Italians in southern Italy, the closing of their churches, the prohibition of their Rite, the removal of their bishops and the imposition of the Latin unleavened bread for the Eucharist. This enforced change in the Byzantine provinces of southern Italy (which brought about the extinction of the Byzantine traditions there) caused anti-Italian riots in Constantinople; the Patriarch subsequently closed the Latin churches in the imperial city.

As a dogmatic justification of this act, the Patriarch advanced the novel tenet that the unleavened oblation of the "Franks" was not a valid Mass. The proclamation of war with the Pope and the West was drawn up by his chief lieutenant, Leo of Achrida, metropolitan of the Bulgarians. It was in the form of a letter addressed to John, Bishop of Trani, in Apulia, at the time subject to the Byzantine emperor, and by decree of Leo the Isaurian attached to the Eastern Patriarchate. John was commanded to have the letter translated into Latin and communicated to the Pope and the Western bishops. This was done by the learned Benedictine, Cardinal Humbert, who happened to be present in Trani when the letter arrived. Baronius has preserved the Latin version; Cardinal Hergenröther discovered the original Greek text:

This validity of the etymological reasoning with the terms artos from airo was and is disputed. The Latin divines found a number of passages in Scripture where unleavened bread is designated as artos. Cardinal Humbert recalled the places where the unleavened loaves of proposition are called artoi. In the Septuagint, one can find the expression artous azymous in Ex., xxix, 2.

Cerularius found the issue politically useful in his conflict with the Latins. In popular opinion, the flour and water wafers of the "Franks" were not bread; their sacrifices were invalid; they were Jews not Christians. Their lifeless bread could only symbolize a soulless Christ; therefore, they had clearly fallen into the heresy of Apollinaris. The controversy became a key factor in producing the East–West Schism, which persists to this day. This question of azyms brought forth a cloud of pamphlets, and made a deeper impression on the popular imagination than the abstruse controversy of the Filioque. But it caused little or no discussion among the theologians at the Councils of Lyons and Florence. At the latter Council the Greeks admitted the Latin contention that the consecration of the elements was equally valid with leavened and unleavened bread; it was decreed that the priests of either rite should conform to the custom of their respective Church.

Modern Russians have claimed for their nation the initiation of the azymes controversy; but the treatises ascribed to Leontius, Bishop of Kiev, who lived a century earlier than Cerularius, and in which all the well-known arguments of the Greeks are rehearsed, are judged to have proceeded from a later pen.

See also
Arbanaška vera

Notes

References

Attribution
 which cites:
Hergenröther, Photius, III, passim; and in K. L., I, 1778–80
Hefele, Conciliengeschichte, 2d ed., IV,766, 772-774
Pitzipios, L'Eglise Orientale
Natalis, Alex. Deazymorum usu, Hist. Eccl. (1778), VII, 380-389
Mabillon, "De azymorum Eucharistico," in Vet. Ann. (1723), 522–547; 
Bona, Rev. Lith. I. c. 23 (a classic text)
"La question des azymes," in Messager des fideles (1889), 485–490.

Eastern Orthodox belief and doctrine
East–West Schism
Eucharist